Joseph Easton Taylor-Farrell is a politician and the current Premier of Montserrat. Before entering politics, he was a businessman.

He once served as the leader of the opposition of the island's Legislative Assembly from 2017 to November 2019. He is the current leader of the Movement for Change and Prosperity political party, having succeeded the island's former Premier Reuben Meade. Previously, Farrell served as the island's Minister of Agriculture, Lands, Housing and the Environment.

References

Year of birth missing (living people)
Date of birth missing (living people)
Living people
Montserratian businesspeople
Movement for Change and Prosperity politicians
Premiers of Montserrat